Kundala Dam (Malayalam: കുണ്ടല അണക്കെട്ട്) is a dam built in Kundala, Madupetty Panchayat in Idukki district of Kerala, India, as part of the Pallivasal Hydroelectric Project on the Muthirapuzha River, a tributary of the Periyar River. It is also called Setuparvatipuram Dam. This dam was completed in 1947. Release from dam is to river Palar and 
taluks through which release flow are Udumpanchola, Devikulam, Kothamangalam, Muvattupuzha, Kunnathunadu, Aluva, Kodungalloor and Paravur. The Kundala dam was constructed for Pallivasal Hydro Electric Project in 1946 and is considered to be Asia’s first arch dam.

Specifications
 Latitude : 10⁰ 08′ 37 ” N
Longitude: 77⁰ 11′ 55” E
Panchayath : Madupetty
Village : KDH Village
District : Idukki
River : Muthirapuzha
 Release from Dam to river : Palar ( Tributory of Muthirapuzha) 
Type of Dam : Masonry- gravity
Classification : HH ( High Height)
Maximum Water Level (MWL) : EL 1759.3 m
 Full Reservoir Level ( FRL) : EL 1758.69 m
Storage at FRL : 7.65 Mm3
Height from deepest foundation : 36.94 m
Length : 259.38 m

Spillway
Spillways are Ogee type and are 5 in numbers. Vertical lift, each of size 5.18 x 2.74 m is fitted on the spillways.

Location
The location of the dam, is at a  distance of 20 km from Munnar. It is a major tourist destination in Munnar. Kundala Dam is located on the way to Munnar Top Station. Tourist places like Pampadumchola National Park,  Kurinjimalai Sanctuary and Meesappulimalai are close to this dam.

Reservoir 

Full Reservoir Level (FRL) is 1758.7m and Minimum Drawdown level (MDDL)is 1735.84 m. Effective Storage at FRL is 7.787 MCM and Generation potential at FRL is	22.74 MU.
The water stored in the Kundala reservoir is released through the palar river to Maduppetty Dam located downstream. The water stored in the Maduppetty reservoir is released to downstream via a canal to a power house. Kundala reservoir has become a tourist spot.

Hydroelectric project

Pallivasal hydro project which is the first hydroelectric project in Kerala uses the water from Kundala dam. The project was completed in two stages. In the first stage, just a run-off river scheme was initially introduced with three units having capacity of 4.5 MW each. The first unit of the Pallivasal power station was commissioned on 19.03.1940. The second unit on 2-2-1941 and the third unit on 19-2-1942. Sethuparvathipuram dam at Kundala and Madupetty dam together contributed about 65 MCM of storage.

References

Dams in Kerala
Dams in Idukki district